Pavel Malcharek (born 16 February 1986) is a Czech football centre forward who plays for MFK Havířov.

Malcharek started his football career in his native Ostrava at Vítkovice. At the age of 16 he already played the Second League for Vítkovice. Eventually he moved to the top Czech club, Sparta Prague but was not able to break to the first squad and was transferred to Slovácko. Malcharek eventually played for Viktoria Plzeň and recently played at Tescoma Zlín. 
In June 2011 he has joined Spartak Trnava.

Malcharek was a member of Czech Republic youth national teams since the under-16 level.

External links

Czech footballers
Czech Republic youth international footballers
Czech Republic under-21 international footballers
1986 births
Living people
Czech First League players
MFK Vítkovice players
AC Sparta Prague players
1. FC Slovácko players
FC Viktoria Plzeň players
FC Fastav Zlín players
FC Spartak Trnava players
Slovak Super Liga players
FC Baník Ostrava players
Sportspeople from Ostrava
Expatriate footballers in Slovakia
Czech expatriate sportspeople in Slovakia
Expatriate footballers in Austria
Czech expatriate sportspeople in Austria
Association football defenders